Patersonia fragilis, commonly known as swamp iris or short purple-flag, is a species of flowering plant in the family Iridaceae family and is endemic to eastern Australia. It is a tufted perennial herb with linear,  cylindrical leaves and pale violet to blue-violet flowers.

Description 
The leaves are biconvex to circular in cross-section, glabrous, pale green to glaucous, and often have a sharply-pointed tip. 

Leaf colour and width and the characteristics of the flowers varies even in the one location.

Taxonomy 
This species was first formally described in 1805 by Jacques Labillardière who gave it the name Genosiris fragilis in his Novae Hollandiae Plantarum Specimen. In 1906, Paul Ascherson and Paul Graebner changed the name to Patersonia fragilis in their book, Synopsis der Mitteleuropaischen. The specific epithet (fragilis) means "brittle" or "fragile".

Distribution and habitat
Swamp iris is endemic to eastern Australia and occurs from Kangaroo Island in the south-east of South Australia, through southern Victoria, northern and eastern Tasmania, the Southern Tablelands of New South Wales, and south-eastern Queensland. It grows in heath, including wet heathland and wallum heathland.

Life cycle 
P. fragilis reproduces through bee pollination. Unlike the zygomorphic yellow flowers, according to the study by Faegri and van der Pijl, purple zygomorphic flowers less commonly attract bees. This problem is highlighted by the unique characteristic of yellow flowers that provides nectar guides, which outline a path for bees to squeeze through to obtain the nectar. Being a flowering plant, P. fragilis follows the same process of pollination and fertilisation in continuation of the life cycle of the plant.

Ecology 
Through a recent botanical survey on the Nelson Bay River, a localised community of P. fragilis was found. It is amongst a group of vegetation communities including the Western Wet Scrub and the Eucalyptus nitida Wet Forest. The Patersonia fragilis, however, is in the Wet Heathlands. In this community of flora, it is dominated by the Swamp Heath Sprengelia incarnata that is surviving despite the dry ground. This plant grows to a maximum of 1.5 metres in height and is often surrounded by empty ground where there is a common absence of large shrubs and trees. P. fragilis is amongst other species of plants in wet heathland, and though the diversity of associated species is limited, the community commonly consist of the Leptocarpus tenax, Selaginella uglinosa, Melaleuca squamea and Xyris sp.

Use in horticulture 
Patersonia fragilis can be propagated from seed but requires a constantly damp soil similar to its natural habitat. It can survive with either full or light sunshade and can only tolerate dry conditions for less than a week.

Conservation 
The wet vegetation communities of the Patersonia fragilis may be subject to the plant pathogens of Phytophthora cinnamomic and Myrtle wilt, both naturally occurring in the wetland regions of South Australia. In areas receiving above 600mm of rainfall per annum, the roots of the Patersonia fragilis may be invaded by the Phytophthora that is a soil borne fungal pathogen. It starves the plant of essential nutrients and water, and this fungus can navigate naturally through the soil to affect an entire healthy community of plants. The spread of the Phytophtora through conducive soil can be transported for long distances by animals and humans where construction machinery or vehicles have passed. Additionally, if the habitat of the Patersonia fragilis is situated close to a deforested site, there is a chance for Myrlte wilt infection to the plant. Commonly caused by the naturally occurring wind born fungi known as Chalara australis, the Patersonia fragilis can be infected if it possesses any open wounds in its stem. This allows the fungus to enter the plant and attack the system by multiplying its spores inside the damaged plant.

References

fragilis
Flora of the Australian Capital Territory
Flora of New South Wales
Flora of Queensland
Flora of South Australia
Flora of Tasmania
Flora of Victoria (Australia)
Asparagales of Australia
Plants described in 1805
Taxa named by Jacques Labillardière